Ukasha ibn Mihsan was one of the companions of the Islamic prophet, Muhammad, he participated in the Nakhla Raid during Muhammad's era. He also participated in the Expedition of Ukasha bin Al-Mihsan, against the tribes of Udhrah and Baliy (also spelt Bali), which took place in October 630, 9AH of the Islamic Calendar.

See also
List of expeditions of Muhammad
Nebi Akasha Mosque

References

Year of birth unknown
Year of death unknown
Date of birth unknown
Date of death unknown
Place of birth unknown
Place of death unknown
Sahabah who participated in the battle of Uhud